Bazyar or Baziar may refer to:
 Bala Bazyar
 Pain Bazyar